Arctosa alpigena is a wolf spider species in the family Lycosidae with a holarctic distribution.

See also 
 List of Lycosidae species

References

External links 

alpigena
Spiders of Europe
Spiders described in 1852
Holarctic spiders